.bw is the Internet country code top-level domain (ccTLD) for Botswana. It is officially administered by the Botswana Communication Regulatory Authority since 2013, previously being administered by the University of Botswana.

Operations 
Most current registrations are at the third level beneath second-level names such as co.bw and org.bw, but some second-level registrations also exist, such as Botswana Telecommunications Corporation's website. However, registrations at the second level have been stoped, and all entities who are currently registered under this level will be given a 3 year grace period to migrate to any other level.

The most visited .bw domain is google.co.bw by Google Inc. in Botswana.

Botswana Communication Regulatory Authority operates a WHOIS service for .bw domains and was previously operated by Botswana Telecommunications Corporation.

Structure

See also 
 ISO 3166-2:BW

References

External links
 IANA .bw whois information
 .bw whois service
 Accredited registrars

Communications in Botswana
Country code top-level domains
Internet in Botswana

sv:Toppdomän#B